The number of national daily newspapers in Greece was 68 in 1950 and it increased to 156 in 1965.

Mid through the Greek financial crisis in 2016, on a national level there were 15 daily general interest, 11 daily sports, 4 daily business, 10 weekly and 16 Sunday newspapers in circulation.

On a local level, almost all regions of Greece have a printed newspaper.

Below is a list of newspapers published in Greece.

Greek daily newspapers

{| class="sortable wikitable"
! Title
! Established
! Owner
! Sunday Edition
! Political orientation
|-
| Apogevmatini || 1952 || Apogevmatines Ekdoseis Monoprosopi AE || Yes || Conservatism
|-
| Avgi || 1952 || I Avgi Ekdotikos & Dimosiografikos Organismos SA || Yes ||Left-wing
|-
| Dimokratia  || 2010 || Dimokratikos Typos SA || Yes || Centre-right
|-
| Efimerida ton Syntakton || 2012 || Anexartita Mesa Maziki Enimerosis SA || No (a weekend edition is published on Saturday) || Centre-left to Left-wing
|-
| Eleftheri Ora  || 1981 || ΜV Press Ltd || Yes || Right-wing
|-
|-
| Eleftheros Typos || 1916 || SABD Ekdotiki SA || Yes || Liberal conservatism
|-
| Estia || 1876 || Estia Newspaper SA || Yes || Conservatism
|-
| Kathimerini || 1919 || Kathimerini Publishing SA || Yes || Liberal conservatism
|-
| Kontra News || 2013 || Kouris Media Group  || Yes || Left-wing
|-
| O Logos  || 1990 || Neo Typografiki MIKE || Yes || Centre Left
|-
| Rizospastis || 1916 || Communist Party of Greece || No (a weekend edition is published on Saturday) || Communism
|-
| Ta Nea || 1931 || Alter Ego Media SA || No (a weekend edition is published on Saturday) || Centrism
|-
| To Manifesto || 2022 || To Manifesto Front Page IKE || No|| Centrism
|-

|}

Greek daily specialized content newspapers

{| class="sortable wikitable"
! Title
! Established
! Owner
! Sunday Edition
! Type
|-
| Naftemporiki || 1924 || Ζοfrank Holdings Co. Ltd.|| No || Financial
|-
| Espresso  || 2000 || Estia Ependitiki SA || No (a weekend edition is published on Saturday) || Tabloid
|-
| Makeleio || 2015 || Makeleio Ltd  || No (a weekend edition is published on Saturday) || Tabloid
|-
| On Time || 2020 || N/A || No (a weekend edition is published on Saturday) || Tabloid
|-
| Star Press  || 2014 || Ellinikos Typos SA || No (a weekend edition is published on Saturday) || Tabloid
|-

|}

Greek daily sports newspapers

{| class="sortable wikitable"
! Title
! Established 
! Affiliation

|-
| Fos  || 1955 || Olympiacos
|-
| Kokkinos Protathlitis || 1998 || Olympiacos
|-
| Livesport 

 || 2012 || Neutral
|-
| Metrosport  || 2000 || PAOK Aris
|-
| Ora ton Spor  || 1991 || AEK
|-
| SportDay  || 2005 || Neutral
|-
| Sportime (online newspaper)  || 1994 || Neutral
|-

|}

Greek Weekly Newspapers

Greek Sunday newspapers

{| class="sortable wikitable"
! Title
! Established
! Owner
! Political orientation

|-
| Documento  || 2016 || Documento Media MIKE || Left Centre Left
|-
| Proto Thema || 2005 || Ekdoseis Proto Thema Ekdotiki SA || Centrism 
|-
| Real News || 2008 || Real Media SA   || Center
|-
| To Vima Ths Kyriakhs || 1922 || Alter Ego Media SA || Centre-left
|-

|}

Greek weekly political newspapers

{| class="wikitable"
! Title

|-
| Dromos tis Aristeras
|-
| Epochi 
|-
| Karfitsa 
|-
| Makedonia
|-
| Mpam 
|-
| Parapolitika 
|-
| Prin
|-
| Sto Karfi 
|-
| To Paraskinio  
|-
| To Paron 
|-
| To Pοntiki 
|-
| Vradyni
|-
|}

Greek weekly free press newspapers

{| class="sortable wikitable"
! Title
! Established
! Owner
! Type
! Day of publication

|-
| Athens Voice || 2003 || Fotis Georgeles || Alternative weekly || Thursday
|-
| Lifo || 2005 || Dyo Deka Ekdotiki SA || Alternative weekly || Thursday
|-
| Thessaloniki  || 2019 || Makedonia Enimerosi SA || Alternative weekly
|-

|}

Greek weekly betting newspapers

{| class="wikitable"
! Title

|-
| 12X 
|-
| Kingbet 
|-
| Match Money 
|-
| Prognospor 
|-
| Provlepsis sto Periptero 
|-
|}

Greek weekly specialized content newspapers

{| class="sortable wikitable"
! Title
! Type

|-
| Apopsi  || Financial
|-
| Efimerida Dimoprasion || Financial
|-
| Echo Dimoprasion || Financial
|-
| Oikonomiki || Financial
|-
| Dimoprasiaki || Financial
|-
| Eleftheros Kosmos || Greek nationalism
|-
| Stochos || National conservatism
|}

Greek local and regional newspapers

Greek defunct newspapers
The following newspapers have terminated their printed versions. Some media groups have kept their titles active on-line.

General interest
24-Ores 
Adesmeftos Typos 
Aggelioforos Thessalonikis 
Akropolis
Avriani 
City Press 
Eleftherotypia
Ethnos 
Fileleftheros
Hora 
Mesimvrini 
Nea Selida 
To Choni

Sports
Athltiki Icho 
Derby 
Gavros 
Filathlos 
Gata 
Goal News
Prasini 
Scorelive

Financial
Imerisia 
Isotimia 
Kerdos 
Express

English
Athens News

Sources

Greece

Newspapers